Francisca de Lebrija was a 16th-century lecturer at the University of Alcalá de Henares in Spain.

Francisca lived in a time when it was very uncommon for educated women to teach and lecture in a university. Spain was one of the few places where women were able to succeed. A part of the reason for this was Queen Isabella who herself was a very well educated woman that encouraged “the love of study by personal example.” In addition to this, women like Francisca were oftentimes able to succeed because their fathers were already in that field and able to help open doors.

Francisca de Lebrija was born to scholar Antonio de Nebrija and Doña Isabel Montesinos de Solis. She was able to successfully lecture in rhetoric to such an extent that it was said to have been done to applause. In addition to this, some sources point to her having assisted her father with his research and writings however, none of her personal work has survived.

See also
 Beatriz Galindo
 Isabella Losa
 Luisa de Medrano
 Juliana Morell

References

Academic staff of the University of Alcalá
16th-century Spanish people
16th-century Spanish women
Rhetoricians
Spanish Renaissance people
16th-century educators
Renaissance women